The 1983 Lion's Cup was a tennis tournament played on indoor carpet courts in Tokyo, Japan that was part of the 1983 Virginia Slims World Championship Series. The tournament was held from November 21 through November 27, 1983.

Winners

Women's singles

 Martina Navratilova defeated  Chris Evert 6–2, 6–2
It was Navratilova's 27th title of the year and the 177th of her career.

Lion's Cup
Lion's Cup
1983 in Japanese tennis